Otto K. Lind (28 November 1920 – 8 September 2000) was a Danish resistance fighter and later general, who served as Chief of Defence.

Lind completed his training at the Royal Danish Military Academy in 1943, at the rank of First Lieutenant shortly before the dissolution of armed forces. He then started working for the resistance movement and collecting intelligence. In 1944, he was arrested in Nørre Nissum, where he was gathering intelligence on the German fortifications. He was taken by the Gestapo to Århus, where he was subjugated to extreme torture. He was later sent to Frøslev Prison Camp, where he spent the remainder of the war.

After the war, he served as lieutenant colonel at Dronningens Livregiment. In 1974, he became major general and chief for the Defence's Operation Staff before becoming chief of BALTAP, in 1980. When Knud Jørgensen retired as Chief of Defence in 1984, Lind was selected as the new Chief, and served a year before Lind had to retire in 1985.

He died in 2000.

Awards and decorations

References

 

1920 births
Danish generals
People from Copenhagen
2000 deaths
20th-century Danish military personnel